Ficus virens is a plant of the genus Ficus found in Pakistan, India, southeast Asia, through Malaysia and into Northern Australia. Its common name is white fig; it is locally known as pilkhan and in the Kunwinjku language it is called manbornde. Like many figs, its fruits are edible. One of the most famous specimens of this tree is the Curtain Fig Tree of the Atherton Tableland, near Cairns, a popular tourist attraction. Another famous example is the Tree of Knowledge in Darwin.

Ficus virens var. sublanceolata occurs the subtropical rainforest of northeastern New South Wales, and south eastern Queensland in Australia.

Description

It is a fig tree belonging to the group of trees known as strangler figs, which is because its seeds can germinate on other trees and grow to strangle and eventually kill the host tree.

It has two marked growth periods in its Indian environment: in spring (February to early May), and in the time of the monsoon rains (i.e. June to early September). The new leaves are a beautiful shade of reddish pink and very pleasing to the eye.

This is a very massive tree in which the size of the crown can sometimes exceed the height of the tree.

Use as food
The leaves are known in Thai cuisine as phak lueat. They are eaten boiled as a vegetable in Northern Thai curries, referred to in the Northern dialect as phak hueat (ผักเฮือด).

References

External links

Galamarrma, The Tree of Knowledge, Darwin, Australia - Exceptional Trees on Waymarking.com

Epiphytes
virens
Flora of tropical Asia
Rosales of Australia
Rosids of Western Australia
Flora of the Northern Territory
Flora of Queensland
Flora of New South Wales